Garh Mahal is a village and union council of Jhelum District in the Punjab Province of Pakistan. It is part of Jhelum Tehsil. The village is about 1.5 km from Rohtas Fort.

References

Populated places in Tehsil Jhelum
Union councils of Jhelum Tehsil